Six ships of the French Navy have borne the name Borda in honour of Jean-Charles de Borda. From 1839 it has been a tradition that the main schoolship of the École navale, a repurposed capital ship, be renamed Borda in this role.

Ships of the French Navy named Borda 
 A 10-gun brig (1834–1849))
  (1807–1884), a 110-gun ship of the line, lead ship of her class, was renamed  Borda in 1839 and used as a schoolship until 1863.
  (1849–1891), a 120-gun ship of the line, was renamed Borda in 1864 and used as a schoolship from that point on, replacing the ex-Commerce de Paris in that role.
  (1864–1889), a 90-gun  steam ship of the line, was renamed Borda in 1890 and used as a schoolship, replacing the ex-Valmy in that role.
  (1873–1899),  an ironclad cruiser, renamed Borda in October 1913. She was the last in that tradition of school ships.
 The hydrographic ship , presently in service

Notes and references

Notes

References

Bibliography 
 
 

French Navy ship names